Somesar is a village in Desuri tehsil of Pali district in Rajasthan state of India. It is also a railway station on Marwar Junction to Ahmedabad route. Population of Somesar is 967 according to census 2001. Male population is 518 while female population is 449.

References
 Location of Somesar
  Somesar VILLAGE population

Villages in Pali district